Edward "Roy" Tutty (7 July 1930 – 6 January 2019) was an Australian speed skater. He competed in two events at the 1960 Winter Olympics.

References

1930 births
2019 deaths
Australian male speed skaters
Olympic speed skaters of Australia
Speed skaters at the 1960 Winter Olympics
Sportspeople from Melbourne